"Officially Yours" is a song by British singer Craig David. It was written by David, Curtis Richardson, Paulo Mendonça, Hiten Bharadia, and Iain James for his fourth studio album Trust Me (2007). Production on the track was helmed by Martin Terefe. Sire Records released the song on 23 June 2008 as the album's fourth and final single in the United Kingdom where it reached number 158 on the UK Singles Chart.

Chart performance
David confirmed the single release at the BBC Radio 1Xtra live event on 22 March 2008. On 14 May 2008, "Officially Yours" was added to the BBC Radio 2 B-list playlist. In the United Kingdom, the single was at a very disappointing number 130 mid-week. However, on Sunday 29 June 2008, the song finally reached number 158 in the UK, becoming his lowest-charting single ever.

Music video
The music video for "Officially Yours" was premiered on 1 May 2008 on David's official YouTube channe. It starts with a segment of "She's on Fire" before showing Craig singing on a stage with two dancers behind him in backdrop. The video was done in black and white format and was directed by Barnaby Roper.

Track listing

Notes
  signifies an additional producer

Charts

References

2008 singles
Craig David songs
Songs written by Craig David
Songs written by Iain James
2008 songs